Robert Leslie Bellem (July 19, 1902 – April 1, 1968) was an American pulp magazine writer, best known for his creation of Dan Turner, Hollywood Detective. Before becoming a writer he worked in Los Angeles as a newspaper reporter, radio announcer and film extra.

Pulps
Bellem wrote in a variety of genres for many pulp magazines, particularly those owned by Culture Publications such as Spicy Detective, Spicy Adventure, Spicy Western and Spicy Mystery (one of the weird menace pulps). The word "spicy" in the titles of these magazines was meant to indicate sexual content, although this was very tame compared with current standards.

Bellem's most famous creation was the hardboiled detective Dan Turner, Hollywood Detective, whose stories were written in the first person in a racy, slangy style that made them extremely popular. Set against the background of the Hollywood film industry (of which Bellem had personal knowledge), the Dan Turner stories appeared first in the pages of Spicy Detective (subsequently retitled Speed Detective) and later in his "own" magazine, Hollywood Detective, which ran from January 1942 to October 1950.

Bellem also created other characters, such as Nick Ransom who appeared a few times in Thrilling Detective, but none proved as successful as Dan Turner. It is claimed that Bellem produced some 3000 short stories in a pulp magazine career lasting less than 30 years.  He also wrote at least two novels, of which the best known is Blue Murder (Phoenix Press, 1938).

S.J. Perelman's essay "Somewhere a Roscoe..." contains excerpts from several of the Dan Turner stories, with Perelman's satiric comments.

TV career
After the demise of the pulps, Bellem switched to writing for television in the 1950s, including a number of scripts for The Lone Ranger, Adventures of Superman, Perry Mason, 77 Sunset Strip, and others.

References

External links

 
 Robert Leslie Bellem bibliographies 1-2 at HARD-BOILED site (Comprehensive Bibliographies by Vladimir Matuschenko)

1902 births
1968 deaths
20th-century American novelists
20th-century American male writers
American male novelists
American mystery writers
American male screenwriters
Pulp fiction writers
American male short story writers
20th-century American short story writers
20th-century American screenwriters